Maurizio Seracini (born 1946) is a diagnostician of Italian art. A 1973 graduate in bioengineering from the University of California, San Diego (UCSD), he founded, in 1977, the first company in Italy for diagnostic and non-destructive analyses on art and architecture, Editech srl, Diagnostic Center for Cultural Heritage in Florence. Adapting technologies from the medical and military fields and other technical measuring instruments he has made possible diagnostics of art and search for art without destroying the artwork itself.

He founded the Center for Interdisciplinary Science for Art, Architecture and Archaeology at the University of California, San Diego’s Institute for Telecommunications and Information Technology in 2007 and served as its director till 2013. From 2014 to 2016, he was a visiting professor at the School of Engineering at Monash University, Melbourne.

Seracini has studied over 4,300 works of art, most notably Leonardo da Vinci's lost mural, the Battle of Anghiari, and The Last Supper, Boticelli's Allegory of Spring and Caravaggio's Medusa. He used high-frequency, surface-penetrating radar to locate the painting behind Vasari’s Battle of Marciano in Val di Chiana. Seracini’s theory was confirmed by an investigation authorized by the city council of Florence and the Italian Minister of Culture at the time.

He works closely with Majestic Arts as an Expert for Scientific Authentication of Works of Art in Asia, Europe, North America and Middle East.

Seracini has been well known for his search for the Leonardo da Vinci mural The Battle of Anghiari in the Salone dei Cinquecento, Palazzo Vecchio, Florence and for his diagnostic survey on Leonardo's Adoration of the Magi.

References 

Editech srl, Diagnostic Center for Cultural Heritage
Da Vinci Decoded
The Times, On the trail of the lost Leonardo

University of California, San Diego alumni
Italian bioengineers
Living people
1946 births